The Baluchi fritillary (Melitaea robertsi) is a butterfly of the Nymphalidae. It is found in Baluchistan and Chitral.

References

Butterflies described in 1880
Melitaea
Balochistan
Butterflies of Asia
Taxa named by Arthur Gardiner Butler